Manuel Batakian, I.C.P.B. (November 5, 1929 – October 18, 2021) was a bishop of the Catholic Church in the United States. He served as an auxiliary bishop to the Armenian Catholic Patriarch from 1995 to 2000, as the third exarch of the Apostolic Exarchate of United States of America and Canada from 2000 to 2005, and as the first eparch (bishop) of Armenian Catholic Eparchy of Our Lady of Nareg in New York from 2005 to 2011.

Biography
Born in Athens, Greece, Batakian was ordained a priest for the Patriarchal Congregation of Bzommar on December 8, 1954. He held various offices as a priest. From 1978 to 1984 Batakian served as the Patriarchal Vicar for the Institute of the Patriarchal Clergy of Bzommar. He then served as the rector of the Armenian Catholic Cathedral in Paris and vicar general of the Eparchy of Sainte-Croix-de-Paris. In 1990 he was named as the rector of the Pontifical Armenian College in Rome.

Pope John Paul II named Batakian as the Titular Bishop of Caesarea in Cappadocia degli Armeni and the Auxiliary Bishop of Cilicia on November 11, 1994. He was ordained a bishop by Patriarch Jean Pierre XVIII Kasparian of the Armenian Catholic Church on March 12, 1995. The principal co-consecrators were Eparchs Grégoire Ghabroyan, I.C.P.B. of Sainte-Croix-de-Paris and André Bedoglouyan, I.C.P.B., the auxiliary of Cilicia. Batakian was named the exarch in the United States of America and Canada by Pope John Paul on November 30, 2000. He became the first eparch of the Eparchy of Our Lady of Nareg in New York when Pope Benedict XVI elevated the North American church to an eparchy, or diocese, on September 12, 2005. He served as eparch in New York until his resignation was accepted by Pope Benedict on May 21, 2011. Batakian died on October 18, 2021.

See also 
 Historical list of the Catholic bishops of the United States
 List of Catholic bishops of the United States

References

External links
 Armenian Catholic Eparchy of Our Lady of Nareg Official Site

Episcopal succession

1929 births
2021 deaths
Clergy from Athens
Members of the Patriarchal Congregation of Bzommar
Greek people of Armenian descent
Armenian Catholic bishops
20th-century Eastern Catholic bishops
21st-century Eastern Catholic bishops
American Eastern Catholic bishops
20th-century American clergy
21st-century American clergy